Cangrejo Cove (British Crab Cove) is a cove  long lying immediately west of Azure Cove in Flandres Bay, along the west coast of Graham Land. It was first roughly charted by the Belgian Antarctic Expedition under Gerlache, 1897–99. The name Bahia Cangrejo ("crayfish cove" or "crayfish bay") was given by the Argentine Antarctic Expedition of 1951–52. The name is descriptive and derives from the small peninsula forming the west side of the cove which, when viewed from the air, resembles the pincers of a crayfish.

References
 SCAR Composite Gazetteer of Antarctica (Cangrejo Cove).
 

Coves of Graham Land
Danco Coast